The 1971 Soviet football championship was the 39th seasons of competitive football in the Soviet Union and the 33rd among teams of sports societies and factories. Dinamo Kiev won the championship becoming the Soviet domestic champions for the fifth time.

Honours

Notes = Number in parentheses is the times that club has won that honour. * indicates new record for competition

Soviet Union football championship

Top League

First League

Second League (finals)

 [Oct 31 – Nov 12, Sochi]

Additional Play-Off
 [Nov 20, 24]

Top goalscorers

Top League
Eduard Malofeyev (Dinamo Minsk) – 16 goals

First League
Vitaliy Razdayev (Kuzbass Kemerovo) – 24 goals

References

External links
 1971 Soviet football championship. RSSSF